Courtenay Place may refer to:

In New Zealand
Courtenay Place, Rotorua, Rotorua
Courtenay Place, Wellington, one of the main streets in Wellington

In the United Kingdom
Courtenay Place, London, Waltham Forest, northwest London
Courtenay Place, Teignmouth, the town centre of Teignmouth, Devon